Saint Martin de l'If is a commune in the department of Seine-Maritime, northern France. The municipality was established on 1 January 2016 by merger of the former communes of Fréville, Betteville, La Folletière and Mont-de-l'If.

Population

See also 
Communes of the Seine-Maritime department

References 

Communes of Seine-Maritime
Populated places established in 2016
2016 establishments in France
States and territories established in 2016